Phạm Tiến Duật (14 January 1941 in Thanh Ba, Phú Thọ – 4 December 2007) was a Vietnamese poet. His best known poems include the war poem White circle.

References

1941 births
2007 deaths